Karin Singer (born 14 May 1966) is a former synchronized swimmer from Switzerland.

References 

1966 births
Living people
Swiss synchronized swimmers
Olympic synchronized swimmers of Switzerland
Synchronized swimmers at the 1984 Summer Olympics
Synchronized swimmers at the 1988 Summer Olympics
Synchronized swimmers at the 1986 World Aquatics Championships